SKA Minsk  is a team handball club from Minsk, Belarus. SKA Minsk competes in the Belarusian First League of Handball.

Accomplishments

National competitions

Belarusian First League of Handball:
Champion (10): 1993, 1994, 1995, 1996, 1997. 1998, 1999, 2000, 2001, 2002

International competitions
European Champion Clubs' Cup:
Winner (3): 1987, 1989, 1990
Cup Winner's Cup:
Winner (2): 1983, 1988
IHF Cup:
Runners-up (1): 1992
EHF Challenge Cup:
Winner (1): 2013
IHF Supercup
Runners-up (1): 1983

Belarusian handball clubs

Current squad
Squad for the 2022–23 season

Goalkeepers 
 23  Konstantin Kovalev
 33  Yahor Stasiuk
Left Wingers
 27  Uladzislau Kryvenka
 55  Pavel Nemkov
Right Wingers
 13   Alexey Shepelenko
 14  Evgeny Nikanovich
Line players
 22  Dzmitry Kamyshyk
 35  Daniil Belyi
 72  Andrei Pushkin

Left Backs
2  Dzmitry Khmialkou
3  Kirill Samoilo
Central Backs
 37  Mikita Chyzhyk
 47  Igor Belyavsky
 69  Aliaksandr Petrovich
Right Backs
 24  Stanislav Shabelnikov
 87  Matsvei Udavenia

Transfers
Transfers for the 2023-24 season

Joining

Leaving

References

http://www.ska-minsk.by/